Sarada, a novel by O. Chandhu Menon, was published in 1892. Due to his death in 1899, Chandu Menon was not able to complete the second part of Sarada.

External links
 Novel and Short Story to the Present Day - by M T Vasudevan Nair

1892 novels
Malayalam novels
Novels by Oyyarathu Chandu Menon
19th-century Indian novels